Moisés "Mo" Hernández (born March 5, 1992) is a professional footballer who plays as a left-back for USL Championship club Miami FC. Born in the United States, he represents the Guatemala national team.

Career
Hernández was signed as a Homegrown Player by FC Dallas on July 30, 2010. He made his professional debut with the club on May 30, 2012, when he came on as a 24th-minute substitute for team-mate Zach Loyd in a US Open Cup match against the Charlotte Eagles. Hernández  was loaned to Guatemalan club Comunicaciones on June 20, 2012, for the remainder of the 2012 MLS season. In January 2013, he was loaned to Deportivo Saprissavof the Costa Rican First Division (UNAFUT).

Hernández made his Major League Soccer (MLS) regular season debut in the 2014 season opener with a start at center back. His performances in MLS allowed him to gain the attention of the Guatemalan National Team, which began calling him up beginning in 2015 including for the 2015 CONCACAF Gold Cup. Hernández  was sent on a season long loan to North American Soccer League side Rayo OKC on April 29, 2016.

On January 24, 2017, FC Dallas announced the club and Hernández had agreed to part ways, due to the uncertain nature of his future with the club. He returned to Comunicaciones permanently.

On July 31, 2018, Hernandez signed a contract to return to FC Dallas. On September 6, 2018, he was loaned to San Antonio FC.

Hernandez was released by Dallas at the end of their 2019 season. On 31 December 2019, Hernández returned to Guatemala and joined Antigua GFC.

Hernández signed with Miami FC of the USL Championship on 19 January 2023.

International goals

References

External links
 
 

1992 births
Living people
American soccer players
American expatriate soccer players
People with acquired Guatemalan citizenship
Guatemalan footballers
FC Dallas players
Comunicaciones F.C. players
Deportivo Saprissa players
Rayo OKC players
San Antonio FC players
Antigua GFC players
Miami FC players
Major League Soccer players
USL Championship players
Liga Nacional de Fútbol de Guatemala players
Liga FPD players
Soccer players from Dallas
North American Soccer League players
United States men's under-20 international soccer players
Guatemala international footballers
2015 CONCACAF Gold Cup players
2021 CONCACAF Gold Cup players
American people of Guatemalan descent
American sportspeople of North American descent
Sportspeople of Guatemalan descent
Association football defenders
Guatemalan expatriate footballers
Expatriate footballers in Costa Rica
Guatemalan expatriate sportspeople in Costa Rica
Homegrown Players (MLS)